The Brodhead-Bell-Morton Mansion, also known as the Levi P. Morton House is a historic Beaux-Arts  home, located at 1500 Rhode Island Avenue, Northwest, Washington, D.C., in the Logan Circle neighborhood.

History

It was built in 1879, to the designs of architect John Fraser, and comprehensively remodeled in 1912 by architect John Russell Pope.

The Beaux-Arts style building originally served as the private residence of John. T. Brodhead, and Jessie Willis Brodhead. 
Between 1939 and 2016, the building served as offices for the National Paint, Varnish, and Lacquer Association (now known as the American Coatings Association). 
Former occupants include Alexander Graham Bell and his wife Mabel Gardiner Hubbard, U.S. Vice President Levi P. Morton, the Embassy of Russia, and U.S. Secretary of State Elihu Root.

The building is listed on the National Register of Historic Places, and the District of Columbia Inventory of Historic Sites.

In February 2016 the Mansion was purchased from American Coatings Association by Hungary to move the Embassy of Hungary there later in the year.

See also
 National Register of Historic Places listings in Washington, D.C.

References

External links

http://www.hmdb.org/marker.asp?marker=4072
https://web.archive.org/web/20090108182656/http://www.archiplanet.org/wiki/Brodhead--Bell--Morton_Mansion

Houses completed in 1884
Beaux-Arts architecture in Washington, D.C.
Houses on the National Register of Historic Places in Washington, D.C.
Logan Circle (Washington, D.C.)